Albert Szukalski (4 April 1945, in Furth im Wald – 25 January 2000, in Antwerp) was a Polish-Belgian visual artist who worked with the use of mixed media and sculpture. Szukalski was born 4 April 1945, Furth im Wald and died 25 January 2000, in Antwerp, Belgium.

Szukalski was best known as the sculptor of works that the artist termed "ghosts". Szukalski traveled to the Nevada desert in 1984 to create "The Last Supper" sculpture, considered to be the centerpiece of the Goldwell Open Air Museum near Rhyolite, Nevada.

12259 Szukalski (1989 SZ1) is a main-belt asteroid discovered on 26 September 1989 by E. W. Elst at the European Southern Observatory.  The object was named in honor of Albert Szukalski.

References

External links 
JPL Small-Body Database Browser on 12259 Szukalski

1945 births
2000 deaths
Belgian people of Polish descent
20th-century Belgian sculptors
People from Furth im Wald